The 1997 International Open was a  professional ranking snooker tournament that took place between 13 and 22 February 1997 at the AECC in Aberdeen, Scotland.

Stephen Hendry won the title by defeating Tony Drago 9–1 in the final. The defending champion John Higgins was defeated by Drago in the semi-finals.


Main draw

References

Scottish Open (snooker)
1997 in snooker
1997 in Scottish sport
Sports competitions in Aberdeen
20th century in Aberdeen